Murgh musallam is a Mughlai dish originating from the Indian subcontinent. It consists of  whole chicken marinated in a ginger-garlic paste, stuffed with boiled eggs and seasoned with spices like saffron, cinnamon, cloves, poppy seeds, cardamom and chilli. It is cooked dry or in sauce, and decorated with almonds and silver leaves.

History 
Murgh musallam literally means 'whole chicken'. The dish was popular among the royal Mughal families of Awadh, now  the state of Uttar Pradesh in India. It also means well done. 
Ibn Battuta described Murgh Musallam as a favourite dish of Muhammad bin Tughluq. The dish was also served in the Delhi Sultanate.

See also
 List of chicken dishes

References

External links 
  Roasted chilli yoghurt chicken (taj murgh musallam)

Indian chicken dishes
Bangladeshi meat dishes
Mughlai cuisine
North Indian cuisine
Indian meat dishes